György Müller (6 May 1938 – 7 February 2003) was a Hungarian  swimmer who won a bronze medal in the 4×200 m freestyle relay at the 1958 European Aquatics Championships. He competed in the same event at the 1960 Summer Olympics, but his team did not reach the finals.

References

1938 births
2003 deaths
Swimmers at the 1960 Summer Olympics
Olympic swimmers of Hungary
Hungarian male swimmers
European Aquatics Championships medalists in swimming